A White Sport Coat and a Pink Crustacean is the third studio album by American singer-songwriter Jimmy Buffett. It was released on June 4, 1973, as his first album for Dunhill. It was the first album to feature Buffett's trademark mustache.

The title of the album is a play on the country song "A White Sport Coat and a Pink Carnation" by Marty Robbins, and it contains several of what later became Buffett's most popular songs.  The album was recorded at outlaw country singer Tompall Glaser's studio in Nashville, Tennessee.  It marks the first reference to Buffett's backup band as "The Coral Reefer Band" and is the first album on which long-time Reefers Michael Utley and Greg "Fingers" Taylor play.

Chart performance
The album reached number 43 on the Billboard Top Country Albums chart, but did not make the Billboard 200 album chart, his last major release not to make that chart.  The single of "The Great Filling Station Holdup" reached number 58 on the Billboard Hot Country Singles chart and "Grapefruit Juicy Fruit" was number 23 on the Billboard Easy Listening chart.

Songs
All of the songs on A White Sport Coat and a Pink Crustacean were written or co-written by Buffett.

The most well-known song of the album, the novelty "Why Don't We Get Drunk (and Screw)", was originally released as a B-side, backing the single "The Great Filling Station Holdup", and inspired some controversy at the time due to its lyrics.  Buffett wrote "Why Don't We Get Drunk" and is credited with doing so, and with playing maracas and beer cans on the album, under the pseudonym Marvin Gardens; derived from a property on the original Atlantic City version of the Monopoly game board.

"He Went to Paris" is a perennial fan-favorite ballad, appearing on most of Buffett's greatest-hits collections.  It was remade by Waylon Jennings in 1980, Doug Supernaw in 1994, and by Buffett himself for his 2003 Meet Me in Margaritaville: The Ultimate Collection.

Both Buffett and Jerry Jeff Walker wrote "Railroad Lady".  Walker recorded the song a year earlier than Buffett, and it was later further popularized by Lefty Frizzell, Merle Haggard, and Willie Nelson.

Critical reception

Although it was not very successful commercially at the time of its release, A White Sport Coat and a Pink Crustacean is generally considered one of Buffett's better albums and the beginning of his success.  Johnny Loftus of AllMusic argues, "while it still lies much closer to Nashville than Key West," the album "does begin to delineate the blowsy, good-timin' Key West persona that would lead him to summer tour stardom" and is "highly recommended for Buffett completists and those interested in his more introspective side."

Track listing

LP record and compact disc
Side A:
 "The Great Filling Station Holdup" (Jimmy Buffett) – 3:02
 "Railroad Lady" (Jimmy Buffett, Jerry Jeff Walker) – 2:46
 "He Went to Paris" (Jimmy Buffett) – 3:29
 "Grapefruit—Juicy Fruit" (Jimmy Buffett) – 2:57
 "Cuban Crime of Passion" (Jimmy Buffett, Tom Corcoran) – 3:42
 "Why Don't We Get Drunk" (Marvin Gardens) – 2:43

Side B:	
 "Peanut Butter Conspiracy" (Jimmy Buffett) – 3:43
 "They Don't Dance Like Carmen No More" (Jimmy Buffett) – 2:57
 "I Have Found Me a Home" (Jimmy Buffett) – 3:58
 "My Lovely Lady" (Jimmy Buffett) – 3:10
 "Death of an Unpopular Poet" (Jimmy Buffett) – 3:39

Compact cassette
Side A:
 "The Great Filling Station Holdup" (Jimmy Buffett) – 3:02
 "Cuban Crime of Passion" (Jimmy Buffett, Tom Corcoran) – 3:42
 "I Have Found Me a Home" (Jimmy Buffett) – 3:58
 "Death of an Unpopular Poet" (Jimmy Buffett) – 3:39
 "Peanut Butter Conspiracy" (Jimmy Buffett) – 3:43

Side B:	
 "Railroad Lady" (Jimmy Buffett, Jerry Jeff Walker) – 2:46
 "He Went to Paris" (Jimmy Buffett) – 3:29
 "Why Don't We Get Drunk" (Marvin Gardens) – 2:43
 "Grapefruit—Juicy Fruit" (Jimmy Buffett) – 2:57
 "They Don't Dance Like Carmen No More" (Jimmy Buffett) – 2:57
 "My Lovely Lady" (Jimmy Buffett) – 3:10

Personnel
The Coral Reefer Band:
Jimmy Buffett – lead vocals, acoustic rhythm guitar
Steve Goodman – acoustic lead guitar
Reggie Young – electric lead guitar
Doyle Grisham – pedal Steel guitar
Ed "Lump" Williams – bass guitar
Mike Utley – piano
Greg "Fingers" Taylor – harmonica
Sammy Creason – drums
Phil Royster – congas
Johnny Gimble – fiddle
Shane Keister – Moog synthesizer
Vassar Clements – fiddle
Ferrell Morris – percussion
Marvin Gardens – maracas and beer cans
Sand Key Chorale (Jimmy Buffett, Don Gant, Buzz Cason) – background voices
The Buffets; Carol Montgomery and Diane Harris – background voices

Singles
"The Great Filling Station Holdup" b/w "Why Don't We Get Drunk" (Released on Dunhill D-4348 in April 1973)	
"They Don't Dance Like Carmen No More" b/w "The Great Filling Station Holdup" (Released on Dunhill D-4353 in 1973)
"Grapefruit Juicy Fruit" b/w "I Have Found Me a Home" (Released on Dunhill D-4359 in July 1973)
"He Went to Paris" b/w "Peanut Butter Conspiracy" (Released on Dunhill D-4372 in October 1973)

References

Jimmy Buffett albums
1973 albums
Albums produced by Don Gant
Dunhill Records albums